Patriotyczny Ruch Odrodzenia Narodowego (PRON) was a Polish popular front that ruled the Polish People's Republic. It was created in the aftermath of the martial law in Poland (1982). Gathering various pro-communist and pro-government organizations, it was attempted to show unity and support for the government and the Polish United Workers' Party (PZPR). PRON was created in July 1982 and dissolved in November 1989.

Members
The Patriotic Movement for National Rebirth included the following member parties:

It also included the following organizations when founded:
Stowarzyszenie PAX (Pax)
Chrześcijańskie Stowarzyszenie Społeczne (ChSS)
Polski Związek Katolicko-Społeczny (PZKS)
It was later joined by many other organizations, such as All-Poland Alliance of Trade Unions, Związek Harcerstwa Polskiego and Towarzystwo Przyjaciół Dzieci. Few members of those organizations were aware of their membership in PRON, as PRON members included organizations, not individuals. PRON membership was required by communist propaganda, and necessary for any organization that wanted to exist on political scene with support of the government.

PRON was mentioned in the amended Polish communist constitution, where it replaced the Front of National Unity. Like its predecessor, it was dominated by the PZPR; the minor parties had to accept the PZPR's "leading role" as a condition of their continued existence.

PRON's chairman was the writer Jan Dobraczyński. The foundation committee included in addition to Dobraczyński: Marian Orzechowski, Janusz Reykowski, Andrzej Przypkowski, Edmund Męclewski, Jan Majewski, Andrzej Elbanowski, Józef Chlebowczyk, Władysław Ogrodziński, Walenty Milenuszkin, Wiesław Nowicki, Jerzy Stencel, Elżbieta Ciborowska, Jerzy Kejna, Piotr Perkowski, Józef Kiełb, Jerzy Ozdowski, Stanisław Rostworowski, Gizela Pawłowska, Zbigniew Gertych, Klemens Krzyżagórski, Anatola Klajna and Zbigniew Siatkowski.

It was the sole organisation to put forward candidates in the 1985 election, which proved to be the last elections in which no opposition candidates were permitted to run. As such, it won every seat in the Sejm.

As part of the Polish Round Table Agreement in April 1989 which paved the way for free elections in Poland, PRON was guaranteed 299 out of 460 Sejm seats (65%), with the remaining 161 up for free election with the opposition Solidarity. In the semi-elections that June, Solidarity won every contested seat in the Sejm as well as 99 out of 100 seats in the reestablished Senate. PRON effectively ceased to exist in August after the Democratic Party and United People's Party announced they would be forming an alliance with Solidarity.  This reduced the PZPR to a minority in the chamber and precipitated the appointment of Poland's first non-Communist government since World War II.  The Patriotic Movement for National Rebirth was formally disbanded in November 1989.

Electoral history

Sejm elections

References
Patriotyczny Ruch Odrodzenia Narodowego entry at PWN Encyklopedia
 and  - entries at WIEM Encyklopedia

Popular fronts of communist states
1982 establishments in Poland
Organizations established in 1982
Organizations disestablished in 1989
1980s in Poland
Polish United Workers' Party
Defunct political party alliances in Poland
Socialist organisations in Poland